Syneches is a genus of hybotid dance flies, insects in the family Hybotidae. There are at least 160 described species in Syneches.

See also
 List of Syneches species

References

External links

 

Hybotidae
Articles created by Qbugbot
Empidoidea genera